Mestre do Sabor (English: Taste Master) is a Brazilian reality television cooking competition format originally created, produced and aired by TV Globo. The series premiered on Thursday, October 10, 2019, at 10:30 p.m. / 9:30 p.m. (BRT / AMT).

The show features chefs competing against each other in various culinary challenges. They are mentored and judged by a panel of professional chefs and other notables from the food industry.

The first season generally received bad reviews from critics and its ratings were below average TV Globo's expectations. The series was renewed for a second season before the first had started airing.

Series overview

  Team Avillez
  Team Katia
  Team Leo
  Team Rafa

Ratings and reception

Brazilian ratings
All numbers are in points and provided by Kantar Ibope Media.

References

External links
 Mestre do Sabor on Gshow.com

2019 Brazilian television series debuts
Brazilian reality television series
Portuguese-language television shows
Rede Globo original programming